Arabic script has numerous diacritics, which include consonant pointing known as , and supplementary diacritics known as . The latter include the vowel marks termed  (singular:).

The Arabic script is a modified abjad, where short consonants and long vowels are represented by letters but short vowels and consonant length are not generally indicated in writing.  is optional to represent missing vowels and consonant length. Modern Arabic is always written with the i‘jām—consonant pointing, but only religious texts, children's books and works for learners are written with the full tashkīl—vowel guides and consonant length. It is however not uncommon for authors to add diacritics to a word or letter when the grammatical case or the meaning is deemed otherwise ambiguous. In addition, classical works and historic documents rendered to the general public are often rendered with the full tashkīl, to compensate for the gap in understanding resulting from stylistic changes over the centuries.

Tashkil (marks used as phonetic guides) 

The bulk of Arabic script is written without  (or short vowels). However, they are commonly used in texts that demand strict adherence to exact pronunciation. It is also quite common to add  to hadiths  and the Bible. Another use is in children's literature. Moreover,  are used in ordinary texts in individual words when an ambiguity of pronunciation cannot easily be resolved from context alone. Arabic dictionaries with vowel marks provide information about the correct pronunciation to both native and foreign Arabic speakers. In art and calligraphy,  might be used simply because their writing is considered aesthetically pleasing.

An example of a fully vocalised (vowelised or vowelled) Arabic from the Basmala:

Some Arabic textbooks for foreigners now use  as a phonetic guide to make learning reading Arabic easier. The other method used in textbooks is phonetic romanisation of unvocalised texts. Fully vocalised Arabic texts (i.e. Arabic texts with /diacritics) are sought after by learners of Arabic. Some online bilingual dictionaries also provide  as a phonetic guide similarly to English dictionaries providing transcription.

Harakat (short vowel marks) 

The  , which literally means 'motions', are the short vowel marks.

Fatḥah 

The   is a small diagonal line placed above a letter, and represents a short  (like the /a/ sound in the English word "cat").

For example:  . The  is not usually written in such cases.

Although paired with a plain letter creates an open front vowel (/a/), often realized as near-open (/æ/), the standard also allows for variations, especially under certain surrounding conditions.

Kasrah 

For example:  .

For example:  . The  is usually not written in such cases, but if  is pronounced as a diphthong ,  should be written on the preceding consonant to avoid mispronunciation. The word  means 'breaking'.

Ḍammah 

The   is a small curl-like diacritic placed above a letter to represent a short /u/ (as in "duke", shorter "you") and its allophones [u, ʊ, o, o̞, ɔ] (as in "put", or "bull"). For example:  .

For example:  . The  is usually not written in such cases, but if  is pronounced as a diphthong ,  should be written on the preceding consonant to avoid mispronunciation.

The word ḍammah (ضَمَّة) in this context means rounding, since it is the only rounded vowel in the vowel inventory of Arabic.

Alif Khanjariyah 

The superscript (or dagger)  , is written as short vertical stroke on top of a consonant.

The dagger  occurs in only a few words, but they include some common ones; it is seldom written, however, even in fully vocalised texts. Most keyboards do not have dagger . The word Allah  is usually produced automatically by entering .

Maddah 

 

However, consecutive s are never used in the Arabic orthography. For example:  .

Alif waslah 

For example: , but  (imshū not mshū). This is because no Arab word can start with a vowel-less consonant (unlike the English school, or skateboard). But when it happens, an alif is added to obtain a vowel or a vowelled consonant at the beginning of one's speech. In English that would result in *ischool, or *iskateboard.

It occurs only in the beginning of words, but it can occur after prepositions and the definite article. It is commonly found in imperative verbs, the perfective aspect of verb stems VII to X and their verbal nouns.

It occurs in phrases and sentences (connected speech, not isolated/dictionary forms):
 To replace the elided hamza whose alif-seat has assimilated to the previous vowel. For example:  or  ‘in Yemen’.
 In hamza-initial imperative forms following a vowel, especially following the conjunction  ‘and’. For example: َ ‘rise and then drink the water’.

Like the superscript alif, it is not written in fully vocalized scripts, except for sacred texts, like the Quran and Arabized Bible.

Sukūn 

The   is a circle-shaped diacritic placed above a letter. It indicates that the consonant to which it is attached is not followed by a vowel, i.e., zero-vowel.

It is a necessary symbol for writing consonant-vowel-consonant syllables, which are very common in Arabic. For example: .

The  may also be used to help represent a diphthong.

Other shapes may exist as well (for example, like a small comma above ⟨ʼ⟩ or like a circumflex ⟨ˆ⟩ in ).

Tanwin (final postnasalized or long vowels) 

    

The three vowel diacritics may be doubled at the end of a word to indicate that the vowel is followed by the consonant n. The signs indicate, from left to right, .

These endings are used as non-pausal grammatical indefinite case endings in Literary Arabic or classical Arabic (triptotes only). In a vocalised text, they may be written even if they are not pronounced (see pausa). See  for more details. In many spoken Arabic dialects, the endings are absent. Many Arabic textbooks introduce standard Arabic without these endings. The grammatical endings may not be written in some vocalized Arabic texts, as knowledge of  varies from country to country, and there is a trend towards simplifying Arabic grammar.

Grammatical cases and  endings in indefinite triptote forms:

 :  nominative case;
 :  accusative case, also serves as an adverbial marker;
 :  genitive case.

Shaddah (consonant gemination mark) 

The shadda or shaddah , or tashdid , is a diacritic shaped like a small written Latin "w".

It is used to indicate gemination (consonant doubling or extra length), which is phonemic in Arabic. It is written above the consonant which is to be doubled. It is the only  that is commonly used in ordinary spelling to avoid ambiguity. For example:  ;   ('school') vs.   ('teacher', female).

I‘jām (phonetic distinctions of consonants) 

The i‘jām  (sometimes also called nuqaṭ) are the diacritic points that distinguish various consonants that have the same form, such as   ب,   ت,   ث,   ن, and   ي. Typically i‘jām are not considered diacritics but part of the letter.

These i‘jām became black dots about the same time as the  became small black letters or strokes.

Typically, Egyptians do not use dots under final  , which looks exactly like   in handwriting and in print.

Several ways of writing .
At the time when the i‘jām was optional, unpointed letters were ambiguous. To clarify that a letter would lack i‘jām in pointed text (i.e. A superscript stroke known as jarrah, resembling a long fatħah, was used for a contracted (assimilated) sin. Thus  were all used to indicate that the letter in question was truly  and not . These signs, collectively known as ‘alāmātu-l-ihmāl, are still occasionally used in modern Arabic calligraphy, either for their original purpose (i.e. marking letters without i‘jām), or often as purely decorative space-fillers. Previously this sign could also appear above the medial form of kāf, when that letter was written without the stroke on its ascender. When kaf was written without that stroke, it could be mistaken for lam, thus kaf was distinguished with a superscript kaf or a small superscript hamza (nabrah), and lam with a superscript l-a-m (lam-alif-mim).

Hamza (glottal stop semi-consonant) 

Which letter is to be used to support the  depends on the quality of the adjacent vowels;

Consider the following words:   ("brother"),   ("Ismael"),   ("mother"). All three of above words "begin" with a vowel opening the syllable, and in each case,  is used to designate the initial glottal stop (the actual beginning). But if we consider middle syllables "beginning" with a vowel:   ("origin"),   ("hearts"—notice the  syllable; singular  ),   ("heads", singular  ), the situation is different, as noted above.

History 

According to tradition, the first to commission a system of harakat was Ali who appointed Abu al-Aswad al-Du'ali for the task. Abu al-Aswad devised a system of dots to signal the three short vowels (along with their respective allophones) of Arabic.

Abu al-Aswad's system 
Abu al-Aswad's system of Harakat was different from the system we know today. The system used red dots with each arrangement or position indicating a different short vowel.

However, the early manuscripts of the Qur'an did not use the vowel signs for every letter requiring them, but only for letters where they were necessary for a correct reading.

Al Farahidi's system 
The precursor to the system we know today is Al Farahidi's system.  found that the task of writing using two different colours was tedious and impractical. Another complication was that the  had been introduced by then, which, while they were short strokes rather than the round dots seen today, meant that without a color distinction the two could become confused.

His system is essentially the one we know today.

Automatic diacritization 
The process of automatically restoring diacritical marks is called diacritization or diacritic restoration. It is useful to avoid ambiguity in applications such as Arabic machine translation, text-to-speech, and information retrieval. Automatic diacritization algorithms have been developed. For Modern Standard Arabic, the state-of-the-art algorithm has a word error rate (WER) of 4.79%. The most common mistakes are proper nouns and case endings. Similar algorithms exist for other varieties of Arabic.

See also 
 Arabic alphabet:
 , the case system of Arabic
 , the basic system of Arabic consonants
 , the phonetic rules of recitation of Qur'an in Arabic
 Hebrew:
 Hebrew diacritics, the Hebrew equivalent
 Niqqud, the Hebrew equivalent of 
 Dagesh, the Hebrew diacritic similar to Arabic  and shaddah

References 

 Alexis Neme and Sébastien Paumier (2019), "Restoring Arabic vowels through omission-tolerant dictionary lookup", Lang Resources & Evaluation, Vol. 53, pp. 1-65

 
Arabic words and phrases
Quranic orthography
Phonetic guides